Midgee is a genus of spiders.

Midgee may refer to the following:

Places
Midgee, Queensland, a locality in the Shire of Fitzroy
Midgee, South Australia, a locality